Rabun may refer to:
 Rabun, a 2003 Malaysian drama film
 Rabun, Alabama, an unincorporated community in Baldwin County, Alabama
 Rabun County, the north-easternmost county in the U.S. state of Georgia